Events from the year 1361 in Ireland.

Incumbent
Lord: Edward III

Events

Arrival of English expedition under Prince Lionel of Clarence, Earl of Ulster, to stem the decline of the colony.

Births

Deaths
Henry de Motlowe, an English-born judge who briefly held office as Lord Chief Justice of Ireland.

References

 
1360s in Ireland
Ireland
Years of the 14th century in Ireland